Pzyche is a novel by Amanda Hemingway published in 1982.

Plot summary
Pzyche is a novel in which the main character is Pzyche Corazin.

Reception
Dave Langford reviewed Pzyche for White Dwarf #48, and stated that "Hemingway clearly has talent but regards SF as an amusing playground where one needn't work one's talent too hard. [...] A pity: Psyche is fun for all its flaws and I'd like to see this author try SF at full stretch."

Reviews
Review by John Hobson (1982) in Vector 110 
Review by Colin Greenland (1983) in Interzone, #4 Spring 1983

References

1982 novels